James McKinney (April 14, 1852 – September 29, 1934) was a U.S. Representative from Illinois.

Born in Oquawka, Illinois, McKinney attended the public schools of Lewis County High School and was given the nickname of "Downey" from his friends.
He served as president of the Aledo (Illinois) Bank 1892-1907.
He served as a member of the Republican State central committee 1894-1906.
He served as a delegate to the Republican State convention in 1896 and 1900.
He was appointed by Governor Yates in 1901 a member of the State railroad and warehouse commission, but resigned in 1902.
He served as president of the Aledo Board of Education in 1902 and 1903.

McKinney was elected as a Republican to the Fifty-ninth Congress to fill the vacancy caused by the death of Benjamin F. Marsh.
He was reelected to the Sixtieth, Sixty-first, and Sixty-second Congresses and served from November 7, 1905, to March 3, 1913.
He was not a candidate for renomination in 1912.
He served as president of the Illinois State Bankers' Association in 1908 and 1909.
He engaged in the real estate loan business in Aledo, Illinois, until his death in that city on September 29, 1934.
He was interred in Aledo Cemetery.

References

1852 births
1934 deaths
American people of Scottish descent
Republican Party members of the United States House of Representatives from Illinois